John Toll,  (born June 15, 1952) is an American cinematographer and television producer. Toll's filmography spans a wide variety of genres, including epic period drama, comedy, science fiction, and contemporary drama. He won the Academy Award for Best Cinematography in both 1994 and 1995 for Legends of the Fall and Braveheart respectively, and has also won numerous BAFTA, ASC, and Satellite Awards. He has collaborated with several noteworthy directors, including Francis Ford Coppola, Edward Zwick, Terrence Malick, Mel Gibson, Cameron Crowe,   The Wachowskis, and Ang Lee.

Outside film, he has shot several commercials, the pilot episode of Emmy Award-winning drama series Breaking Bad, and has served as chief cinematographer on the Netflix original series Sense8 by the Wachowskis, on which he also got executive producing credit in its second season.

Life and career
Born in Cleveland, Ohio, Toll began work on his first film Norma Rae, in 1978 as a camera operator. He won back-to-back Academy Awards for Best Cinematography in 1994 and 1995, for the movies Legends of the Fall and Braveheart.
He is also only 1 of 4 cinematographers to win back-to-back Oscars.

He was also nominated for an Academy Award for his work on The Thin Red Line and won an Honorable Mention at the 49th Berlin International Film Festival. He was also nominated for a Primetime Emmy Award for the pilot of Breaking Bad.

He has been a regular collaborator for acclaimed filmmakers like Francis Ford Coppola, Edward Zwick, Cameron Crowe and The Wachowskis. He was presented with the ASC's Lifetime Achievement Award on February 14, 2016.

Personal life 
Toll is married to Lois Burwell who also worked on Braveheart as the make-up artist (for which she also won an Oscar).

Filmography

Film

Television

Awards

Academy Awards

BAFTA Awards

Satellite Awards

American Society of Cinematographers

Other awards

References

External links
 

1952 births
Living people
American cinematographers
Artists from Cleveland
Best Cinematographer Academy Award winners
Best Cinematography BAFTA Award winners